Daniel R. Cameron (February 9, 1885 – October 27, 1933) was a lumber merchant and political figure in Nova Scotia, Canada. He represented Cape Breton East in the Nova Scotia House of Assembly from 1928 to 1933 as a Liberal-Conservative member.

He was born in New Glasgow, Nova Scotia, the son of Hugh M. Cameron and Annie Fraser. In 1912, he married Catherine Burchill. Cameron was mayor of Glace Bay from 1913 to 1916. He served as president of the Union of Nova Scotia Municipalities. Cameron died in Glace Bay at the age of 48.

References 
 A Directory of the Members of the Legislative Assembly of Nova Scotia, 1758-1958, Public Archives of Nova Scotia (1958)

1885 births
1933 deaths
Mayors of places in Nova Scotia
People from New Glasgow, Nova Scotia
Progressive Conservative Association of Nova Scotia MLAs